Herbert Edgar Williams (13 July 1885 – 29 October 1924) was an  Australian rules footballer who played with Geelong in the Victorian Football League (VFL).

He died in a road accident in Geelong on 29 October 1924. A motor car collided with the bicycle he was riding and he sustained a fractured skull.

Notes

External links 

1885 births
1924 deaths
Australian rules footballers from Victoria (Australia)
Geelong Football Club players
Geelong West Football Club players
Road incident deaths in Victoria (Australia)
Cycling road incident deaths